Joaquín La Habana is a queer singer, dancer, actor and drag artist.

Early life and education 
Joaquín La Habana was born in Havana, Cuba. In 1966 he emigrated to the US, studying music and dance at Elma Lewis School of Fine Arts (1967–1971) and Boston Conservatory at Berklee (1969–1971), with teachers such as James Truitte, Geoffrey Holder, Talley Beatty and others.

Career
In the early 1970s La Habana moved to New York, where he took small roles as a dancer on Broadway and in musical films such as Hair and The Wiz. At the same time, he began to explore the genre of drag, and for a short period lived a female identity in his everyday life. He performed at Studio 54 with numbers alluding to artists such as Josephine Baker. La Habana worked with the queer theater avantgarde of La MaMa E.T.C., with artists such as Charles Ludlam and Jack Smith. La Habana starred in the queer experimental film Love Thing.

Since 1981, La Habana has lived in Berlin. He performed with the Chez Nous theater, performed in stagings of La Cage aux Folles, and in various films of Rosa von Praunheim, notably City of Lost Souls.

In the 1990s he started working on a series of performances exploring his Afro-Caribbean heritage, which he presented in venues such as Ethnological Museum of Berlin, Haus der Kulturen der Welt and Werkstadt der Kulturen, as well as in the frame of Karneval der Kulturen.

La Habana practices as a Santéria priest and regularly teaches workshops and classes in Afro-Caribbean music and dance.

Selected filmography 
 1972: Joaquín (documentary) by Serge Raoul
 1978: The Wiz by Sidney Lumet
 1979: Hair by Miloš Forman
 1980 (2012): Love Thing by Michael Mannetta
 1981: Fort Apache, The Bronx by Daniel Petrie
 1983: City of Lost Souls by Rosa von Praunheim
 1984: Horror Vacui by Rosa von Praunheim
 1984: Drama in Blond by Lothar Lambert
 1986: A Virus Knows No Morals by Rosa von Praunheim
 2007: The Art of Seduction by Bernhard P. Beutler
 2013: Joaquín La Habana – Living Between Worlds (documentary) by Bernhard P. Beutler
 2017: Survival in Neukölln by Rosa von Praunheim

References

Further reading 
 Larrain, Gilles, Idols, 1973.
 Cobler, Veretta, New York Underground 1970–1980, 2004.
 Male Performance, 1986, edited by Norbert Kosmowski and Ronald Dittrich.

External links 
 
 Joaquín La Habana, portrait on the homepage of his management. 
 Interview with Joaquín La Habana on We're in this together 
 Clips from various performances on YouTube

1952 births
20th-century LGBT people
American LGBT singers
Hispanic and Latino American drag queens
Cuban male dancers
Living people